Dov Segev-Steinberg (born Tel Aviv, 1956) is an Israeli diolom who was the Israeli Ambassador to Finland and non-resident Ambassador to Estonia. He was also Ambassador to South Africa from 2008 until 2013 and Consul General in Mumbai. In 2022, he became Chargé d'affaires in Myanmar. 

The ambassador earned a combined degree in Arabic Literature and History of the Middle East from Tel Aviv University. He has been described as a “first-class cook.”

References

 

Ambassadors of Israel to Estonia
Ambassadors of Israel to Finland
Ambassadors of Israel to South Africa
Israeli consuls
Tel Aviv University alumni
1956 births
Living people